Alt-y-Craig railway station (later renamed Allt-y-Graig) was an unstaffed halt on the Dyserth branch line. Like  further down the line, passengers would have had to access the station from a hill. The only piece of railway history that remains here is the bridge that people now walk on.

The branch line to Dyserth was opened by the LNWR in 1869, initially for mineral traffic only. A passenger service was instituted in 1905 but lasted only until 1930, when it was withdrawn by the LMS. The line remained open to serve a quarry at Dyserth until complete closure in 1973.

References

Sources

External links
disused-stations.org.uk

Disused railway stations in Denbighshire
Former London, Midland and Scottish Railway stations
Railway stations in Great Britain opened in 1929
Railway stations in Great Britain closed in 1930